The American Landrace is an American breed of domestic pig. It is white in color, with a long body, fine hair, a long snout and heavy, drooping ears. Like all landrace pigs, it derives from the Danish Landrace.

History 

The American Landrace derives from the Danish Landrace, which in turn derives from cross-breeding in the late nineteenth century between local Danish pigs and Large White stock imported from Britain. In 1934 twenty-four of these pigs were imported from Denmark by the United States Department of Agriculture for cross-breeding and research purposes, with a condition that they not be used to create a purebred commercial stock. That restriction was lifted in 1949 and a breed association, the American Landrace Association, was established in 1950. The new breed was founded on stock that was either purebred Danish or had a small percentage of Poland China blood. To reduce inbreeding, thirty-eight pigs of Danish, Swedish and Norwegian Landrace descent were imported in 1954 from Norway.

Characteristics 

The American Landrace is a long, lean, white pig with 16 or 17 ribs. The head is long and narrow, the ears are large and heavy and hang forward close to the snout. The back is only slightly arched or is nearly flat. The side is even and well-fleshed and the ham is plump but not over-fat. The sows produce plenty of milk, the lactation peaking at five weeks, which is rather later than is the case in most breeds. They are prolific with good mothering abilities.

References 

Pig breeds
Pig breeds originating in the United States